is a 1985 Japanese comedy film directed by Yoji Yamada. It stars Kiyoshi Atsumi as Torajirō Kuruma (Tora-san), and Kanako Higuchi as his love interest or "Madonna". Tora-san, the Go-Between is the thirty-fifth entry in the popular, long-running Otoko wa Tsurai yo series.

Synopsis
In Nagasaki, Tora-san and an acquaintance help an old woman who has fallen and injured herself. She invites them to her home where the three share a night of eating and drinking. The old woman's health deteriorates and she dies. At her funeral, Tora-san falls in love with the old woman's daughter, but winds up acting as a go-between for her and a young law student.

Cast
 Kiyoshi Atsumi as Torajirō
 Chieko Baisho as Sakura
 Mitsuru Hirata as Tamio Sakata
 Kanako Higuchi as Wakana Egami
 Shimojo Masami as Kuruma Tatsuzō
 Chieko Misaki as Tsune Kuruma (Torajiro's aunt)
 Hisao Dazai as Boss (Umetarō Katsura)
 Gajirō Satō as Genkō
 Hidetaka Yoshioka as Mitsuo Suwa
 Gin Maeda as Hiroshi Suwa
 Keiroku Seki as Ponshū

Critical appraisal
Series composer Naozumi Yamamoto was nominated for Best Music Score at the Japan Academy Prize for his work on Tora-san, the Go-Between. Though commenting that the film opens with an especially funny dream-sequence satirizing The Ballad of Narayama Stuart Galbraith IV judges this film to be one of the weaker of the series. It treads no new ground for the series, instead putting Tora-san in situations in which he had been before. The German-language site molodezhnaja gives Tora-san, the Go-Between three and a half out of five stars.

Availability
Tora-san, the Go-Between was released theatrically on August 3, 1985. In Japan, the film was released on videotape in 1987 and 1996, and in DVD format in 2000, 2005, and 2008.

References

Bibliography

English

German

Japanese

External links
 Tora-san, the Go-Between at www.tora-san.jp (official site)

1985 films
Films directed by Yoji Yamada
1985 comedy films
1980s Japanese-language films
Otoko wa Tsurai yo films
Shochiku films
Films with screenplays by Yôji Yamada
Japanese sequel films
1980s Japanese films